Absent Sounds is the third studio album by American band From Indian Lakes. It was released in October 2014, on the label Triple Crown.

Track list

References

2014 albums
From Indian Lakes albums
Triple Crown Records albums